The Pingat Pentadbiran Awam (Tentera) is a decoration awarded to members of the Singapore Armed Forces for meritorious service in command or staff positions, and has three grades:
  Emas (Gold)
  Perak (Silver) (Bar)
  Perak (Silver)
  Gangsa (Bronze)

Recipients are entitled to use the post-nominal letters PPA, and may include the grade in brackets - e.g.: PPA(E).

The Pingat Pentadbiran Awam is the civil equivalent award.

Description
 The ribbon is red with two white edge stripes.

References
World Medals PPA page

Military awards and decorations of Singapore